Allocation may refer to:

Computing
 Block allocation map
 C++ allocators
 Delayed allocation
 File allocation table
 IP address allocation
 Memory allocation
 No-write allocation (cache)
 Register allocation

Economics
 Asset allocation
 Economic system
 Market allocation scheme
 Resource allocation
 Tax allocation district

Telecommunication
 Call-sign allocation plan
 Frequency allocation
 Type allocation code

Other

 Allocution (law), or allocutus, is a formal statement made to the court
 Allocation (oil and gas) in hydrocarbon accounting to assign the proper portions of aggregated petroleum and gas flows back to contributing sources
 Allocation voting in voting
 Location-allocation, used in geographic information systems (GIS)
 The allocation of scarce resources in operations research

See also
 Location (disambiguation)